The Liushu formation is a geological formation in the Gansu province of China that spans up to 100 m thick and is widely distributed within the Linxia Basin, with a paleomagnetic age of between 11 and 6.4 Mya (Upper/Late Miocene).

The formation is divided into three parts which represent three different ages, generally referred to as the "upper part" (youngest, at 6-7 mya), the "middle part" (intermediate, at 9 to 7.6 mya. Also known as the Dashengou fauna, and the "lower part" (oldest).

Mammals

Ungulata

Perissodactyla 
The Liushu formation displays a lineage of Elasmotheriine rhinoceros throughout its stratigraphy. Iranotherium is restricted to the middle part of the formation but remains become absent in the overlying layers, the only Elasmotheriine that can be found in the upper layers is Sinotherium.

Artiodactyla

Carnivora

Caniformia

Feliformia

Glires

Proboscidea

Birds

References

Geologic formations of China
Miocene Series